Salvia brevilabra is a perennial plant that is native to Sichuan province in China, growing on hillsides, grasslands, and in forests at   elevation. The stem leaves are somewhat smaller, and more triangular in shape.

Notes

brevilabra
Flora of China
Taxa named by Adrien René Franchet